Ditrigona mytylata is a moth in the family Drepanidae. It was described by Achille Guenée in 1868. It is found in northern India and Myanmar.

References

Moths described in 1868
Drepaninae
Moths of Asia